The Minister for Nordic Cooperation (prev. Minister for Nordic Affairs is a cabinet minister within the Danish Government appointed by the Prime Minister of Denmark.

The minister is responsible for issues regarding Nordic affairs, trade and development. The current Minister for Nordic Cooperation is Louise Schack Elholm, appointed on 15 December 2022.

List of ministers

See also 
 Minister for Nordic Cooperation (Finland)
 Minister for Nordic Cooperation (Iceland)
 Minister for Nordic Cooperation (Sweden)

References

External links 
 Official website

Nordic Cooperation
Nordic politics
1957 establishments in Denmark